Khoda Hafez, Pashto: خداۍ حافظ,  (Khoda Hafej), Kurdish:), usually shortened to Khodafez in Persian is a common parting phrase originating in the Persian language that is used in Iran, Afghanistan and the Indian subcontinent and to a lesser extent, Azerbaijan, Iraq, and Kurdistan. The locution is the most common parting phrase among both Muslims and non-Muslims in Iran; it is also sometimes used by non-Muslims of South Asia, including some Christians and Parsis.

Meaning 
Literally translated it is: "May God be your Guardian". Khoda, which is Persian for God, and hāfiz in Arabic means "protector" or “guardian”. The vernacular translation is, "Good-bye". The phrase is also used in the Azerbaijani, Sindhi, Urdu, Hindi, Bengali and Punjabi languages. It also can be defined as "May God be your protector."

Romanization 
Transliterations may also include Khudā Hāfiz, Khudā Hāfez, and Khodā Hāfiz. One would traditionally respond with replying Khudā Hāfiz. Khuda Hafiz and the English term Goodbye have similar meanings.  Goodbye is a contraction of "Go(o)d be with ye".

References

External links
 The Milli Gazette: Khuda Hafiz versus Allah Hafiz: a critique by Mahfuzur Rahman
 Daily Times: Khuda Hafiz ka Allah hee Hafiz by Ejaz Haider

Parting phrases
Bengali words and phrases
Persian words and phrases
Hindi words and phrases
Urdu-language words and phrases